Henry Arthur Vilhelm Holmberg (23 April 1924 – 21 July 1981) was a featherweight freestyle wrestler from Sweden who won a bronze medal at the 1951 World Championships. He competed at the 1952 Summer Olympics, but was eliminated in the third bout.

References

External links
 

1924 births
1981 deaths
Olympic wrestlers of Sweden
Wrestlers at the 1952 Summer Olympics
Swedish male sport wrestlers
World Wrestling Championships medalists
20th-century Swedish people